Dasia subcaerulea, Boulenger's dasia or Boulenger's tree skink, is a species of tree skink endemic to the Western Ghats in south India.

References

 Boulenger, G.A. 1891 On new or little known Indian and Malayan reptiles and batrachians. Ann. Mag. nat. Hist. (6) 8: 288-292
 Greer, Allen Eddy Jr. 1970 The Relationships of the Skinks Referred to the Genus Dasia. Breviora 348:1-30
 

subcaerulea
Reptiles of India
Endemic fauna of the Western Ghats
Reptiles described in 1891
Taxa named by George Albert Boulenger